Barrow County Schools is a public school district based in Winder, Georgia, United States, serving Barrow County.

Schools

Elementary schools
 Auburn Elementary
 Bethlehem Elementary
 Bramlett Elementary
 County Line Elementary
 Holsenbeck Elementary
 Kennedy Elementary
 Statham Elementary
 Yargo Elementary
 Winder Elementary

Middle schools
Bear-Creek Middle School
 Haymon-Morris Middle School
 Russell Middle School
 Westside Middle School
 Winder-Barrow Middle School (closed 2013)

High school
Apalachee High School
Winder-Barrow High School
Barrow Arts and Sciences Academy

Learning Centers
 Snodon Preparatory School (now closed and replaced with Foothills Charter High School. Kids who attended are divided between AHS, WBHS, and Foothills Charter.)
 Sims Academy of Innovation & Technology

References

External links
 

School districts in Georgia (U.S. state)
Education in Barrow County, Georgia